James Brewer (October 3, 1920 – June 3, 1988), also known as Blind Jim Brewer (although Brewer did not like this additive: "My mother didn't name me "Blind", she named me "Jim"), was an American blues singer and guitarist.

Born in Brookhaven, Mississippi, United States, he moved to Chicago, Illinois, in the 1940s, spending the latter part of his life busking and performing both blues and religious songs at blues and folk festivals, on Chicago's Maxwell Street and other venues. In Chicago, he often performed with Arvella Gray. In the 'boom' time during the 1960s blues revival period, Brewer worked on the college circuit and appeared on television. During that time, he had recordings issued on Heritage, Flyright and Testament Records.

Studio albums
Jim Brewer (Philo, 1974)
Tough Luck (Earwig, 1983)

References

1920 births
1988 deaths
People from Brookhaven, Mississippi
20th-century African-American male singers
African-American songwriters
American blues guitarists
American male guitarists
American blues singers
American street performers
Blues musicians from Mississippi
Chicago blues musicians
20th-century American guitarists
Songwriters from Illinois
Songwriters from Mississippi
Guitarists from Illinois
Guitarists from Mississippi
Earwig Music artists
African-American guitarists
American male songwriters